There have been several bombings of Iraq:
Gulf War air campaign
Cruise missile strikes on Iraq (1993)
Cruise missile strikes on Iraq (1996)
Bombing of Iraq (1998)
No fly zones conflict (1991-2003)
2003 invasion of Iraq
Bombings during the Iraq War
2014 military intervention against ISIL